Kallithea is a village and the seat of the homonymous municipal district in Kassandra. It is located in the regional unit of Chalkidiki. It has a population of 779 inhabitants according to the 2001 census.

History

Archeology 
This area is archaeologically famous, since in Kallithea a sanctuary of Dionysus and the Nymphs has been excavated, part of the sanctuary of Amun Zeus (which was venerated in the area since the 5th century BC) and the altar area. In the middle of the 4th century BC a great Doric style temple was built in his honor. Dionysus had already begun to be worshiped in the area since the 8th century BC, as evidenced by a staircase carved out of the rock and a cave dedicated to the worship of the god.

The Paleo-Christian basilica was discovered by archaeologists in the place of Solinas. The original and only Paleo-Christian basilica dates from the 6th century. Its central corridor is occupied by a previous building, which appears to have been a house of martyrdom.

Modern era 
The village was founded in 1925 by refugees from Asia-Minor who settled in the area after the Asia Minor Catastrophe, who came from the village of Maltepe. They named Neos Maltepes to the settlement they created, in memory of their homeland, Maltepe. The main occupations of the inhabitants were agriculture and livestock. The town after 1950 was renamed Nea Kallithea and finally Kallithea, due to the beautiful view of the village.

See also 

 Chalkidiki
 Regional units of Greece

References 

Villages in Greece